Joseph Wang is an American biomedical engineer and inventor. He is a Distinguished Professor, SAIC Endowed Chair, and former Chair of the Department of Nanoengineering at the University of California, San Diego, who specialised in nanomachines, biosensors, nano-bioelectronics, wearable devices, and electrochemistry. He is also the Director of the UCSD Center of Wearable Sensors and co-director of the UCSD Center of Mobile Health Systems and Applications (CMSA).

Biography
Wang was awarded a D.Sc in 1978, after which he served as a postdoctoral research associate at the University of Wisconsin, Madison until 1980. Then, he joined the Department of Chemistry and Biochemistry at New Mexico State University, position he maintained until 2004. At NMSU, he became a Regents Professor and holder of the Manasse Chair from 2001 to 2004.

From 2004 to 2008, he served as the Director of the Center for Bioelectronics and Biosensors at the Biodesign Institute and as a professor of Chemical Engineering and Chemistry at Arizona State University (ASU). In 2008, he joined UCSD's Jacobs School of Engineering, serving as Chair of the Nanoengineering Department between 2014 and 2019.

Wang founded the journal Electroanalysis (published by Wiley-VCH) in 1988, serving as its editor-in-chief until 2018.

The advances made by Wang and his research teams have been described in over 1200 research papers and reviews, that were cited over 150,000 times, leading to a H-index of 194 according to Google Scholar. He has supervised 40 PhD students and over 350 researchers and visiting students. Wang is also the author of 11 books and holds 30 patents.

He is a member of the US National Academy of Inventors, being elected in the class of 2022 and of the Turkish Academy of Sciences (TÜBA), having received the TÜBA Presidential Science Award in 2022 for "his original, pioneering and groundbreaking research in basic and engineering sciences due to inventions that have strong and widespread worldwide impact on biosensors, nanobioelectronics, wearable sensors, micro-robotics and nanomotors that push the boundaries of health systems".

Fields of research 
Wang's early research focused on electrochemical biosensors and detectors for clinical diagnostics and environmental monitoring, mainly on blood glucose monitoring for diabetes management. His current research interests include the development of nanomotors and nanomachines, wearable non-invasive sensors, electrochemical biosensors, bioelectronics, microfluidic (“Lab-on-a-Chip”) devices, and remote sensors for environmental and security monitoring.

Wang led a team that successfully merged efforts in the fields of biosensors, bioelectronics and nanotechnology to fashion nanocrystals that can act as amplifying tags for DNA or protein biosensors. His work in the field of nanomachines, involving novel motor designs and applications, has led to the world's fastest nanomotor, the first demonstration of nanomotor operation in living organism (towards treating stomach and lung disorders), embedding microrobots within oral pills, a novel motion-based DNA biosensing, nanomachine-enabled isolation of biological targets, such as cancer cell identification, and advanced motion control in the nanoscale.

Wang has also introduced the use of body-worn flexible electrochemical sensors for non-invasive biomarker monitoring and epidermal biofuel cells harvesting sweat bioenergy  including textile and epidermal-tattoo devices, touch-based fingertip sweat sensing, microneedle-based electrochemical biosensors for real-time, pain-free quantification of circulating metabolites and electrolytes,. His work towards portable environmental and security sensor systems includes new 'green' bismuth electrodes for sensing toxic metals, remote submersible devices for continuous environmental monitoring and hand-held lead analyzer.

Published books
 Stripping Analysis: Principles, Instrumentation, and Applications - 1985
 Electrochemical Techniques in Clinical Chemistry and Laboratory Medicine - 1988
 Biosensors and Chemical Sensors - 1992, with Peter G. Edelman
 Analytical Electrochemistry - 1st, 2nd, 3rd and 4th editions from 1994, 1999, 2006 and 2023, respectively
 Biosensors for Direct Monitoring of Environmental Pollutants in Field - 1997, with Dimitrios P. Nikolelis, Ulrich J. Krull and Marco Mascini
 Electrochemistry of Nucleic Acids and Proteins - 2005, with Emil Paleček and Frieder W. Scheller
 Electrochemical Sensors, Biosensors and their Biomedical Applications - 2007, with Xueji Zhang and Huangxian Ju
 NanoBiosensing: Principles, Development and Application - 2011, with Xueji Zhang and Huangxian Ju
 Nanomachines: Fundamentals and Applications - 2013

Wang has also been the Founding Editor-in-Chief of the journal Electroanalysis, from 1988 - 2018.

Awards 

 Heyrovsky Medal, Heyrovsky Institute, Prague, Czech Republic - 1994 
 American Chemical Society National Award in Analytical Instrumentation, 1999 
 Regents Professorship, New Mexico State University - 2001
 Manasse Chair, New Mexico State University - 2001
 Honorary Professorship, National University, Cordoba, Argentina - 2004 
 American Chemical Society National Award for Electrochemistry, 2006 
 Doctor honoris causa, Complutense University, Madrid, Spain - 2007 
 Honorary Member, Slovenia National Institute of Chemistry in Ljubljana - 2007 
 Fellow, American Institute for Medical and Biological Engineering - 2010 
 Honorary Professor, University of Science and Technology Beijing - 2011 
 Doctor honoris causa, Alcala University, Alcala, Spain - 2011 
 Bruno Breyer Medal of the Royal Australian Chemical Institute - 2012 
 Spiers Memorial Award of the UK Royal Society of Chemistry - 2013 
 Fellow, Royal Society of Chemistry - 2013 
 SAIC Endowed Chair, University California San Diego - 2014
 Honorary Professor, Fudan University, PR China - 2016 
 Sir Louis Matheson Distinguished Visiting professor, Monash University, Melbourne, Australia - 2015 to 2018 
 Honorary Professor, Charles University, Prague, Czech Republic - 2017 
 Honorary Professor, University of Medicine and Pharmacy, Cluj, Romania - 2017 
 Honorary Professor, Comenius University, Bratislava, Slovakia - 2018 
 Heyrovsky Honorary Medal, Czech National Academy of Sciences - 2018 
 European Society of Electroanalytical Chemistry (ESEAC) Lifetime Achievement Award - 2018 
 Electrochemical Society, Sensor Achievement Award - 2018 
 C.N. Reilley Award, Society of Electroanalytical Chemistry (SEAC) - 2019 
 Electrochemical Society Fellow - 2019 
 Talanta Medal - 2021 
 Inaugural IUPAC Analytical Chemistry Medal - 2021 
 IEEE Sensors Achievement Award - 2021 
 TÜBA Turkish National Academy Presidential Award - 2022 
 Ralph N. Adams Award in Bioanalytical Chemistry - 2022

References

External links 
 Joseph Wang Research Group at UC San Diego

1948 births
Living people
Fellows of the American Institute for Medical and Biological Engineering
University of California, San Diego faculty